Keulenberg is a mountain of Saxony, southeastern Germany. It's located near Oberlichtenau, which is part of the small town of Pulsnitz.

Mountains of Saxony
Pulsnitz